Flame in the Heather is a 1935 British historical drama film directed by Donovan Pedelty and starring Gwenllian Gill, Barry Clifton and Bruce Seton. It was made as a quota quickie at British and Dominions Elstree Studios. Much of the film was shot on location around Fort William. It was fairly unusual as a low-budget quota film to be set in the past, as most films tended to have contemporary settings.

Plot
During the Jacobite Rebellion, an English spy infiltrates the Clan Cameron, but falls in love with the chief's daughter.

Cast
 Gwenllian Gill as Alison
 Barry Clifton as Colonel Stafford
 Bruce Seton as Murray
 Richard Hayward as Fassiefern
 Ben Williams as Rushton
 Kenneth McLaglen as Donald
 Rani Waller as Myrat
 Francis de Wolff as Hawley

References

Bibliography
 Chibnall, Steve. Quota Quickies: The Birth of the British 'B' Film. British Film Institute, 2007.
 Low, Rachael. Filmmaking in 1930s Britain. George Allen & Unwin, 1985.
 Wood, Linda. British Films, 1927–1939. British Film Institute, 1986.

External links

1935 films
British historical drama films
1930s historical drama films
Films set in the 1740s
Films set in Scotland
Films shot in Scotland
Films directed by Donovan Pedelty
Quota quickies
Films shot at Imperial Studios, Elstree
Paramount Pictures films
British black-and-white films
1935 drama films
1930s English-language films
1930s British films